Todd Woodbridge and Mark Woodforde were the defending champions, but lost in the second round this year.

Grant Connell and Patrick Galbraith won the title, defeating Luke Jensen and Murphy Jensen 6–3, 6–4 in the final.

Seeds
All seeds receive a bye into the second round.

Draw

Finals

Top half

Bottom half

References
Draw

Tennis tournaments in Japan
1993 ATP Tour
Tokyo Indoor